American film actress Juliette Lewis has received numerous nominations and awards throughout her career, which began in 1987. She first received critical recognition for her role on the television series I Married Dora (1987–1988), for which she was nominated for a Young Artist Award for Best Actress. Lewis subsequently garnered significant acclaim for her performance in Martin Scorsese's Cape Fear (1991), for which she was nominated for an Academy Award for Best Supporting Actress, a Golden Globe Award for Best Supporting Actress, and recognition from various critical circles. She subsequently won the Pastinetti Award for Best Actress at the Venice Film Festival for her performance in Oliver Stone's Natural Born Killers (1994).

In 2002, Lewis was nominated for a Primetime Emmy Award and Independent Spirit Award for her performance in the television film Hysterical Blindness.

Academy Awards
The Academy Awards are a set of awards given by the Academy of Motion Picture Arts and Sciences annually for excellence of cinematic achievements.

Blockbuster Entertainment Awards
The Blockbuster Entertainment Awards was a film awards ceremony, founded by Blockbuster Entertainment, Inc., that ran from 1995 until 2001. The awards were produced by Ken Ehrlich each year.

Daytime Emmy Awards
The Daytime Emmy Award is an American accolade bestowed by the New York–based National Academy of Television Arts and Sciences in recognition of excellence in American daytime television programming.

Golden Globe Awards
The Golden Globe Award is an accolade bestowed by the 93 members of the Hollywood Foreign Press Association (HFPA) recognizing excellence in film and television, both domestic and foreign.

Golden Nymph Awards
The Golden Nymph Awards are the prizes awarded to the winners of the Official Competition of the Monte-Carlo Television Festival.

Golden Raspberry Awards
The Golden Raspberry Awards are awarded in recognition of the worst in film, parodying other annual awards shows celebrating the best achievements in the industry.

Hollywood Film Awards
The Hollywood Film Awards are held annually to recognize talent in the film industry.

Independent Spirit Awards
The Independent Spirit Awards are presented annually by Film Independent, to award best in the independent filmmaking.

MTV Movie Awards
The MTV Movie Awards is an annual award show presented by MTV to honor outstanding achievements in films. Founded in 1992, the winners of the awards are decided online by the audience.

Primetime Emmy Awards
The Primetime Emmy Awards are presented annually by the Academy of Television Arts & Sciences, also known as the Television Academy, to recognize and honor achievements in the television industry.

Saturn Awards
The Saturn Awards are presented annually by the Academy of Science Fiction, Fantasy, and Horror Films to honor science fiction, fantasy, and horror films, television, and home video.

Screen Actors Guild Awards
The Screen Actors Guild Awards are organized by the Screen Actors Guild‐American Federation of Television and Radio Artists. First awarded in 1995, the awards aim to recognize excellent achievements in film and television.

Venice Film Festival

Young Artist Awards
The Young Artist Award is an accolade presented by the Young Artist Association, a non-profit organization founded in 1978 to honor excellence of youth performers, and to provide scholarships for young artists who may be physically disabled or financially unstable.

Critics associations

References

Lists of awards received by American actor